S7 or S-7 may refer to:

Electronics and software
 Acer Aspire S7, a laptop
 Samsung Galaxy S7, a smartphone
 Samsung Galaxy Tab S7, a tablet computer 
 , an automation system based on Programmable Logic Controller from Siemens, successor to Simatic S5 PLC
 Sub7, a computer backdoor

Media
 Sovereign Seven, a superhero team and comic book published by DC Comics in 1995–1998
 Samurai 7, a 2004 anime series

Science and technology
 7-sphere (S7), an n-sphere
 Heptasulfur (S7), a cyclic allotrope of sulfur
 S7 or S-7, a grade of tool steel
 S7: Keep container tightly closed, a safety phrase in chemistry

Transportation

Air
 Ambrosini S.7, an Italian racing aircraft flown before World War II
 Rans S-7 Courier, a light aircraft
 S7 Airlines, a Russian commercial airliner, its IATA Airlines code is also S7

Automobiles
 Audi S7, a German executive sports sedan
 BYD S7, a Chinese mid-size SUV formerly known as S6
 Haima S7, a Chinese compact SUV
 Huansu S7, a Chinese mid-size SUV
 JAC Refine S7, a Chinese mid-size SUV
 Saleen S7, an American supercar

Motorcycles
 Sunbeam S7, a British motorcycle

Rail

Trains
 London Underground S7 Stock, a type of train on London Underground, England
 Prussian S 7, a Prussian steam locomotives class

Lines
 S7 (Vienna), an S-Bahn line in Austria
 S7 (Berlin), an S-Bahn line in Germany
 S7 (Munich), an S-Bahn line in Germany
 S7 (Rhine-Main S-Bahn), an S-Bahn line in Germany
 S7 (Rhine-Ruhr S-Bahn), an S-Bahn line in Germany
 S7 (St. Gallen S-Bahn), an S-Bahn line in Switzerland
 S7 (ZVV), an S-Bahn line in Zürich, Switzerland
 Capital Airport–Daxing Airport intercity railway, or Line S7, Beijing, China
 Line S7 (Nanjing Metro), China

Roads and routes

 County Route S7 (California)
 Expressway S7 (Poland)

Watercraft
 HMS Sealion (S07), a 1959 British Porpoise-class submarine
 USS S-7 (SS-112), a 1920 S-class submarine of the United States Navy

Other uses
 S7 (classification), a disability swimming classification
 S7 postcode, a postcode covering areas of southern Sheffield, England
 British NVC community S7, a swamps and tall-herb fens community in the British National Vegetation Classification system